Churchville Presbyterian Church is a historic Presbyterian church located at Churchville, Harford County, Maryland.  It consists of three harmoniously designed sections: the original one-story, four by three bay, gable-roofed brick building dated to 1820; the three-story, restrained Italianate, brick bell tower added in 1870; and the low, one-story brick church hall and office added in 1950.  Located adjacent is a sequestered  graveyard with stones dating back to 1819. The community of Churchville, which surrounds the church, grew up around and took its name from the structure.

The 1870 addition of an Italianate, brick belltower was designed by architect J. Crawford Nielson of the firm Niernsee and Neilson.

It was listed on the National Register of Historic Places in 1986.

Notable burials
John Archer (1741–1810), U.S. Representative, Maryland delegate, physician
R. Harris Archer (died 1922), Maryland delegate
Stevenson Archer (1786–1848), U.S. Representative and Maryland delegate
Stevenson Archer (1827–1898), U.S. Representative and Treasurer of Maryland
J. Wilmer Cronin (1896–1982), state politician and lawyer from Maryland
Stevenson A. Williams (1851–1932), Maryland state senator

References

External links

, including photo from 1979, at Maryland Historical Trust

Presbyterian churches in Maryland
Churches in Harford County, Maryland
Churches on the National Register of Historic Places in Maryland
Churches completed in 1820
19th-century Presbyterian church buildings in the United States
Churchville, Maryland
National Register of Historic Places in Harford County, Maryland